Plana is a village in Stolichna Municipality, Sofia City Province, Bulgaria.

Geography
Plana is a small village, situated along the Plana mountain ridge at 1200 m. above sea level. It is divided into several neighborhoods - Masova, Kalenderova, Tourmachka, Charshiska, etc.

History
Its population has Aegean root and is composed of settlers from the nearby village Chuypetlovo, located on the south slope of Vitosha mountain. 
Under the Ottoman rule of Bulgaria, there had been a Turkish farm which was the workplace of a lot of Chuypetlovo villagers. The big distance between the farm and their homes led to them moving closer, domestic workers first, and soon after - agricultural workers who bought the land from the farm for their homes.

Villages in Sofia City Province